Supraspinal means above the spine, and may refer to,

above the spinal cord and vertebral column:
brain

or above the spine of scapula:
supraspinatus muscle
supraspinatous fascia
supraspinatous fossa
supraspinous ligament